Theophilus Ferguson John is a Saint Lucian politician. From 1997 until 2006 he was the parliamentary representative for Choiseul and Saltibus and the Minister for Physical Development, Environment and Housing of Saint Lucia. He is also the vice chairman of the Saint Lucia Labour Party.

References

Living people
Year of birth missing (living people)
Members of the House of Assembly of Saint Lucia
Saint Lucia Labour Party politicians